Kupsch is a surname. People with the surname include:

 Bob Kupsch (1933–1998), Australian rules footballer 
 Hans-Karl von Kupsch (1937–2020), German jurist, managing director of the Börsenverein des Deutschen Buchhandels
 Ken Kupsch (born 1938), former Australian rules footballer

Surnames from given names
Surnames